Settlers of Canaan is a licensed adaptation of Catan that incorporates Hebrew Bible themes into its multiplayer board game play.  It was published in 2002 by Cactus Game Design, based in North Carolina.

Settlers of Canaan takes place in the ancient land of Canaan, which roughly corresponds to the northern half of present-day Israel.

Gameplay
Players play the roles of various tribes of Israel which settled in this geographical region. The game progresses very similarly to the Catan: as players expand their settlements throughout the land, they trade resources and make strategic choices to outmaneuver their opponents.

Differences from Catan
The most striking difference in the Settlers of Canaan is its fixed playing board. Like with many Catan variants, both the hexagonal land tiles and the numerical disks are printed directly on the board. Also, one land tile, called the "copper hex" (equivalent to the "gold hex" in some expansions to Settlers of Catan), allows bordering players to select which resource(s) it produces. Trading ports are scattered along the western coastline, which borders the Great Sea, as well as around the shoreline of the Sea of Galilee, which is surrounded by land tiles.

In Settlers of Canaan, the "robber" is called the "plague".  Moving the robber is referred to as "cleansing the plague" from a particular land tile, and it has the same effect as in Settlers of Catan.

The object of the game is to amass 12 victory points.  Current scores are indicated by color-coded markers on the eastern side of the playing board.  Victory points are earned by building settlements and cities, by building the longest road, by amassing the most priests (equivalent to knights/soldiers in Settlers of Catan), and by obtaining the "King's Blessing".

If ties exist in competition for either the longest road or the most priests, then the corresponding 2-point bonus is removed from play.

The game ends when a player reaches 12 victory points or when the "Wall of Jerusalem" is completed, whichever comes first. In the latter scenario, the player with the most victory points wins the game. (If two or more players tie, then the winner is the player who has contributed more stones to the Wall of Jerusalem. If a tie exists in this tiebreaker, then gameplay continues until a clear winner emerges.)

The Wall of Jerusalem and the King's Blessing
A player may build a "stone for Jerusalem" at a cost of one stone resource (called "clay" in Catan) and one ore resource, during his or her turn under one of two conditions:
 The player owns a settlement or city on the southern border of Canaan (west of the Salt Sea), or
 Another player owns a settlement or city on the southern border of Canaan, and the current player owns a settlement or city that is connected to the other player's settlement or city by a (multiplayer) trade route.

When a player builds a stone for Jerusalem, this stone is immediately placed in the Wall of Jerusalem, an area in the desert south of Canaan which can hold up to 28 such stones. If a player builds a stone using a multiplayer trade route, then that player must pay one resource card of his or her choice to the owner of the trade route's final settlement or city.

The player who has contributed the most stones to the Wall of Jerusalem earns the King's Blessing, which is worth 2 victory points and gives that player the privilege of trading a resource of his or her choice at a 2:1 ratio. (This trade benefit is the same as that of the Merchant in Cities and Knights of Catan.) If another player later ties for the most stones in the Wall of Jerusalem, then the King's Blessing is removed from play until someone achieves a singular majority.

Every time a 7 is rolled during gameplay, a black stone is added to the Wall of Jerusalem. These stones do not affect the King's Blessing, but they may help bring the end of the game before anyone reaches the required 12 victory points.

Development cards
Many development cards in this game resemble those from Settlers of Catan; several are similar to progress cards from Cities and Knights of Catan. Some, however, are unique to this game. Below is a list of available development cards; the quantity of each type of card is given in parentheses.

Settlers of Catan development cards
 The "Road Building" card is called "New Trade Route." (1)
 The "Year of Plenty" card is called "Plentiful Lands." (1)
 The "Knight/Soldier" card is called "Priest." (20)
 The "Monopoly" card is called "Caleb's Blessing" (1)
 The single victory point cards are called "Divine Guidance," "City of Refuge," "Ladder to Heaven," and "Ten Commandments." (4)

Cities and Knights of Catan progress cards
 The "Spy" card is called "Gibeon/Gibeonite Trickery." (1)
 The "Merchant Fleet" card is called "Caravan." (2)
 The "Medicine" card is called "Improvements." (1)
 The "Irrigation" card is called "Bountiful Harvest." (1)
 The "Alchemist" card is called "Prophet." (1)

Unique development cards
 The "Korah's Rebellion" card allows a player to remove another player's Priest card and shuffle it into the remaining development cards. (1)
 The "Deborah's Song" card allows each player to select one resource card from the bank, regardless of whose turn it is. (1)

External links

Card games introduced in 2002
Canaan
Hebrew Bible in popular culture
Canaan